ATK (previously known as Atlético de Kolkata), was an Indian football club based in Kolkata, West Bengal, that played in Indian Super League. It was established on 7 May 2014 as the first team in the Indian Super League, and played its home games at the Salt Lake Stadium. The club was merged with Mohun Bagan to form Mohun Bagan FC on 1 June 2020.

List of players

Appearances and goals are for Indian Super League and Super Cup  matches only.
Players are listed according to the date of their first team debut for the club. Only players with at least one appearance are included.

Statistics correct as of 1 June 2020

Table headers
 Nationality – If a player played international football, the country/countries he played for are shown. Otherwise, the player's nationality is given as their country of birth.
 Career span – The year of the player's first appearance for ATK to the year of his last appearance.
 Matches – The total number of games played, both as a starter and as a substitute.

References

Lists of Indian Super League players
Indian Super League players
Lists of association football players by club in India
 
Association football player non-biographical articles
ATK (football club) players